3D Ultra Minigolf Adventures is a 2006 arcade golf video game for Microsoft Windows and Xbox 360 developed by Wanako Games and published by Vivendi Games. The game released on December 20, 2006, for Microsoft Windows, and April 18, 2007, for Xbox 360.

Gameplay
The game focuses on arcade elements rather than stick to a simulation way of miniature golf. While traditional stroke rules apply, there are power-ups to be found throughout each course, like making the player's ball jump, or the hole become a vacuum. The original release of the game comes with three courses and overall 36 holes, which are set within space, a carnival, and a Wild West. The courses have their own separate conditions and traps, like scorpions in the Wild West one. One of the features present is the course editor. It allows the player to customize all aspects of the course, including the ability to place hazards and power-ups in any location. There are two modes to play, either a single-player tournament or a multiplayer game both locally and online for 2-4 players.

One of the main features is the map editor. It allows the player to customize all aspects of the course (ramps, intersections, turns), including the ability to place hazards and power-ups in any location. Tournament mode offers a choice between four characters, along with 3 control styles: Hold and Release, 3-Click, and Analog Control.

Development
Sierra Online announced the development of 3D Ultra Minigolf Adventures on September 27, 2006, saying that it would release on Xbox Live Arcade in the winter of the same year. On July 25, 2007, the Lost Island expansion pack was added for Xbox Live, introducing another eighteen-hole course. Sales at the end of 2011 were approximately 34,000 units.

Reception

The game received mixed to positive reviews from critics upon release, according to review aggregator Metacritic.

Eurogamer reviewed the game, saying that "it's adequate amusement for the price, but still falls short of the gut-busting potential presented by online crazy golf". IGN praised the multiplayer modes and graphics, while also adding that "3D Ultra Mini Golf Adventures is a fun multiplayer game". GameSpot criticized the pace of how the game plays and physics, but liked the multiplayer mode and the course creator. The reviewer said that "3D Ultra Minigolf Adventures is an unremarkable game that fails to capture the fun of real miniature golf".

Sequel
A sequel titled 3D Ultra Minigolf Adventures 2, was released in 2010.

References

2006 video games
Miniature golf video games
Sierra Entertainment games
Windows games
Xbox 360 Live Arcade games
Xbox 360 games
Video games developed in Chile